Gitanjali Group was one of the largest branded jewellery retailers in the world. It was headquartered in Mumbai, India. Gitanjali used to sell its jewellery through over 4,000 Points of Sale and enjoyed a market share of over 50 per cent of the overall organised jewellery market in India. Prominent brands housed by the group included Nakshatra, D'damas, Gili, Asmi, Sangini, Maya, Giantti, World of Solitaire and Shuddhi. It was closed following Punjab National Bank Fraud more commonly known as Nirav Modi Fraud.

Listing
The company was listed on Bombay Stock Exchange with script code 532715, National Stock Exchange of India script name Gitanjali

2018 Investigation 

Mehul Choksi, the founder and managing director of ‘Gitanjali Gems’ and the maternal uncle of Nirav Modi has come under the radar of various investigating agencies, following the Enforcement Directorate (ED) filing a case against the latter for conducting fraudulent transactions from the Punjab National Bank. This case is claimed to be India's biggest bank fraud wiping out 14,000 crore rupees. Mehul Choksi fled India along with his nephew after the F.I.R was filed about the bank scam.

See also
 Nirav Modi
Punjab National Bank Scam

References

 
Companies based in Mumbai
Jewellery retailers of India
Retail companies established in 1966
Indian jewellery designers
Conglomerate companies of India
1966 establishments in Maharashtra
Companies listed on the National Stock Exchange of India
Companies listed on the Bombay Stock Exchange